A palindromic place is a city or town whose name can be read the same forwards or backwards. An example of this would be Navan in Ireland. Some of the entries on this list are only palindromic if the next administrative division they are a part of is also included in the name, such as Adaven, Nevada.

Issues
Because the names here come from a variety of languages, several issues arise.

Unbalanced diacritics
Diacritics are marks placed on or near letters to give them a modified pronunciation. Some languages treat such as completely different letters; others treat them as variants of the base letter. The latter group is summarized here. Only place names where the language of the country is in the latter group are included here when diacritics make for an apparent non-palindrome.

Turkic vowels
Some Turkic languages (Turkish, Azerbaijan, Kazakh) have two or more vowels that resemble the I. They are differentiated by the number of dots above the letter: zero, one, or two. These dots appear on both lower and upper case letters. For places in Turkey, Azerbaijan, and Kazakhstan, only those vowels that have the same number of dots will be considered equal here.

ʻOkina in Polynesian languages
The ʻokina is a consonant found in several Polynesian languages. It is pronounced as a glottal stop and is often represented by an apostrophe when the correct character ʻ is not available. Because English wordplay generally ignores apostrophes, it is common to ignore ʻokinas in deciding whether a Polynesian name is a palindrome. However, this list does not follow that rule. Unbalanced ʻokinas will not be found in this list. However that rule has not been applied consistently to the Arabic hamza, which also represents a glottal stop.

Palindromic place names
Palindromatic place names in the Latin alphabet are:

12 letters
Adaven, Nevada, United States
Adanac, Canada (Nipissing District, Ontario)
Adanac, Canada (Parry Sound District, Ontario)
Adanac, Canada (Saskatchewan)

11 letters
Wassamassaw, South Carolina, United States (with several variant spellings during the colonial era)

10 letters
Saxet, Texas (United States)

9 letters
Ellemelle, Belgium
Kanakanak, Alaska, United States
Kinikinik, Alberta, Canada
Kinikinik, Colorado, United States
Oktahatko, Florida, United States
Paraparap, Victoria, Australia

8 letters
 Burggrub, Germany
 Idappadi, Tamil Nadu, India
Nari, Iran (Razavi Khorasan)
Nari, Iran (Dul Rural District, Urmia County, West Azerbaijan)
Nari, Iran (Silvaneh District, Urmia County, West Azerbaijan)

7 letters
Abiriba, Nigeria
Acaiaca, Brazil
Akasaka, Japan (Okayama)
Akasaka, Japan (Tokyo)
Alavala, Andhra Pradesh, India
Aramara, Australia
Ateleta, Italy (L'Aquila)
Aworowa, Ghana
Ebenebe, Anambra, Nigeria
Etsaste, Estonia
Glenelg, Highland, Scotland
Glenelg, South Australia, Australia
Glenelg, Nova Scotia, Canada
Glenelg, Maryland, United States
Ikazaki, Ehime, Japan
Itamati, Odisha, India
Margram, West Bengal, India
Noagaon, Bangladesh
Neuquén, Argentina
Okonoko, West Virginia, United States
Planalp, Switzerland
Qaanaaq, Greenland
Senones, Vosges, France
Ubulubu, Delta State, Nigeria

6 letters

5 letters

4 letters

3 letters

2 letters
Aa, Estonia
Aa, Indonesia
Ee, Cook Islands
Ee, Netherlands
Ii, Finland
Oo, Indonesia

1 letter
(Arguably not a palindrome, or perhaps a degenerate palindrome)
A, Japan
Å, Andøy, Norway
Å, Moskenes, Norway
Å, Meldal, Norway
Å, Åfjord, Norway
Å, Ibestad, Norway
Å, Lavangen, Norway
Å, Tranøy, Norway
Å, Sweden
Ö, Sweden
U, Pohnpei, Federated States Of Micronesia
W National Park, Burkina Faso 
Y, France
Y, Alaska, United States

Palindromes that include abbreviations
Some place names make a palindrome when they include the abbreviation of the state or province they are in.

8 letters
 Apollo PA (Pennsylvania, United States)

7 letters
 Omaha MO (Missouri, United States)

6 letters
 Linn IL (variant name of Orio, Illinois, United States)

5 letters
 Lis IL (Illinois, United States) 
 Roy OR (Oregon, United States)

See also
Palindrome
Anagram
Palindroma
List of geographic anagrams and ananyms

Sources

GotoEuro Information
City Name Database (at nona.net)
I Love Me, Vol. I, Palindrome Encyclopedia, Michael Donner, Algonquin Books of Chapel Hill, 1996
Geographic Names Information Service
Canadian Geographic Names Data base
store/MapMarker

Palindromes
Palindromic